Khadar Ayderus Ahmed (born 10 January 1981), is a Finnish-Somali director and writer. He is best known for directing the feature film The Gravedigger's Wife.

Personal life
Ahmed was born on 10 January 1981 in Mogadishu, Somalia. At the age of 16, he moved to Finland as a refugee with his family.

Career
In 2008, he wrote the script of the short film Citizens where he also worked as the second assistant director. Then in 2014, he directed the first short Me ei vietetä joulua which received critics acclaim. He later directed two more short films Yövaras (2017) and The Killing of Cahceravga (2018).

In 2021, Ahmed directed his maiden film Guled & Nasra, which is internationally known as The Gravedigger's Wife. The film premiered in July 2021 at the Cannes Film Festival in the Semaine internationale de la critique. The film received critics acclaim and screened in many film festivals. Later the film received two nominations at the Cannes Film Festival for Critics' Week Grand Prize and Golden Camera. The film was also nominated for the Grand-Prix Award under the International Competition at the Kyiv International Short Film Festival. Then in the same year, he was again nominated for the Amplify Voices Award at the Toronto International Film Festival. The film became the first Academy Award submission from Somalia.

Filmography

Awards and nominations

References

External links
 

Living people
Finnish film directors
Somalian film directors
1981 births
People from Mogadishu
Somalian emigrants to Finland